Hamma Hammami (born 8 January 1952) is a Tunisian communist, leader of the Popular Front, spokesman of the Tunisian Workers' Party, and former editor of the party news organ El-Badil.

Activities
Hammami was imprisoned and tortured for his political activism against the rule of President Zine El Abidine Ben Ali and was noted for strong opposition to the government of Ben Ali.

On 12 January 2011, he was arrested at his home for speaking to journalists about the Tunisian revolution. He was subsequently released on 15 January by the interim government of Fouad Mebazaa.

Personal life
Hamma Hammami was born on 8 January 1952 in El Aroussa, Tunisia. He is married to the human rights lawyer Radhia Nasraoui. Together they have three daughters, Nadia, Oussaïma and Sarah.

Works 
Hamma Hammami is the author of several political essays in Arabic language including:
Against obscurantism, Tunis, 1985
The perestroïka : An against-revolution, Tunis, 1988
History of the labor movement in Tunisia, Tunis, 1988
Tunisian society: social and economic study, Tunis, 1989
About secularism, Tunis, 1990
Tunisian women: present and future, Tunis, 1992
The path of dignity, Paris, 2002
Who judges whom?, Tunis, 2013
Liberty or Tyranny?, Tunis, 2013
Women and socialism today, Tunis, 2015
 About liberties and equalities, Tunis, 2019

See also
18 October Coalition for Rights and Freedoms

References

1952 births
Living people
People from Tunis
People of the Tunisian Revolution
Popular Front (Tunisia) politicians
Tunisian communists
Tunisian activists
Tunisian journalists
Tunisian prisoners and detainees
Anti-revisionists
Hoxhaists
Candidates for President of Tunisia